Jimmy-Shammar Sanon (born 24 January 1997) is a Haitian footballer.

Club career

FC Montreal
Sanon signed his first professional contract for Montreal Impact reserve team FC Montreal on 4 July 2017. He made his debut against Louisville City on July 5, 2016.

Ottawa Fury
On 23 March 2017 Sanon was signed by Montreal Impact affiliate Ottawa Fury.

In November 2017, Sanon re-signed with Ottawa for the 2018 season.

International
In December 2013, Sanon was called up by Canada for an U16 camp. He subsequently participated in an U18 camp in April 2014 and played for the Canadian U18s at the 2014 Tournoi de Limoges in October of the same year.

In October 2016, he was called up by Haiti for their U-20 team to compete in the 2017 CONCACAF U-20 Championship qualifying tournament.

Sanon made his debut for the senior Haiti national football team in a 3-3 2017 Kirin Challenge Cup tie with Japan on 10 October 2017. In May 2019, he was named to Haiti's 40-man provisional squad for the 2019 CONCACAF Gold Cup.

Honours

Individual 
 USL Goal of the Year: 2016

References

External links 
 http://www.jimmyshammarsanon.com

1997 births
Living people
Citizens of Haiti through descent
Haitian footballers
Association football midfielders
Haiti under-20 international footballers
Haiti international footballers
Sportspeople from Laval, Quebec
Soccer people from Quebec
Canadian soccer players
Haitian Quebecers
Black Canadian soccer players
FC Montreal players
Ottawa Fury FC players
USL Championship players
Canada men's youth international soccer players
CS Monteuil players